The Matawan-Aberdeen Regional School District is a regional public school district in Monmouth County, New Jersey, United States. The district serves students from pre-kindergarten through twelfth grade from the communities of Aberdeen Township and Matawan Borough.

As of the 2018–19 school year, the district, comprising seven schools, had an enrollment of 3,827 students and 324.1 classroom teachers (on an FTE basis), for a student–teacher ratio of 11.8:1.

The district is classified by the New Jersey Department of Education as being in District Factor Group "FG", the fourth-highest of eight groupings. District Factor Groups organize districts statewide to allow comparison by common socioeconomic characteristics of the local districts. From lowest socioeconomic status to highest, the categories are A, B, CD, DE, FG, GH, I and J.

The Matawan-Aberdeen Regional School District Central Offices are located at 1 Crest Way, in Aberdeen.

History
In 2015, New Jersey Superior Court judge David F. Bauman dismissed a case filed against the district filed by a student of the district and by the American Humanist Association that argued that a discriminatory climate was created by the inclusion of the phrase "under God" in the Pledge of Allegiance recited by students, making non-believers "second-class citizens" by elevating religious belief. He noted; "As a matter of historical tradition, the words 'under God' can no more be expunged from the national consciousness than the words 'In God We Trust' from every coin in the land, than the words 'so help me God' from every presidential oath since 1789, or than the prayer that has opened every congressional session of legislative business since 1787."

Schools 
The district is a comprehensive system comprising seven schools, which includes one preschool, three elementary schools grades K-3, one 4-5 school, one middle school grades 6-8, one high school grades 9-12. Schools in the district (with 2018–19 enrollment data from the National Center for Education Statistics) are:
Preschool
Cambridge Park Developmental Learning Center (12 students; Preschool)
Maggie Lazur, Director of Preschool
Elementary schools
Cliffwood Elementary School (320; K-3)
Mark Van Horn, Principal
Ravine Drive Elementary School (326; K-3)
Jessie Zitarosa, Interim Principal
Strathmore Elementary School (397; K-3)
Kelly Bera, Principal
Lloyd Road Elementary School (614; 4-5)
Joseph Jerabek, Principal

Middle school
Matawan Aberdeen Middle School (888; 6-8)
Michael C. Wells, Principal
High school
Matawan Regional High School (1,112; 9-12)
Aaron Eyler, Principal

Administration
Core members of the district's administration are:
Joseph G. Majka, Superintendent of Schools
Alex Ferreira, Business Administrator / Board Secretary

Board of education
The district's board of education, with nine members, sets policy and oversees the fiscal and educational operation of the district through its administration. As a Type II school district, the board's trustees are elected directly by voters to serve three-year terms of office on a staggered basis, with three seats up for election each year held (since 2012) as part of the November general election. Seats on the district's board of education are allocated based on the population of the constituent municipalities, with six assigned to Aberdeen Township and three to Matawan.

References

External links 
Matawan-Aberdeen Regional School District

School Data for the Matawan-Aberdeen Regional School District, National Center for Education Statistics
Article About School Snow days in 2007

New Jersey District Factor Group FG
School districts in Monmouth County, New Jersey
Aberdeen Township, New Jersey
Matawan, New Jersey